Maulana Muhammad Akram Toofani (born; 1930 - 26 December 2021) was a Pakistani Islamic scholar and one of the central leaders of the Aalmi Majlis Tahaffuz Khatm-e-Nubuwwat. He was an alumnus of Jamia Ashrafia. He was a Khatib in a local mosque in Sargodha. He established Khatam un Nabiyeen Medical Complex & Heart Center in Sargodha. Toofani died of a heart attack on 26 December 2021.

Education and career 
He started his religious education from Jamia Ashrafia Lahore and completed Dars-i Nizami and in 1964 he completed Hadith studies. After graduating he visited Sargodha and started preaching in a local mosque.

Among the scholars from whom he has benefited Ahmad Ali Lahori, Syed Ata Ullah Shah Bukhari, Shamsul Haq Afghani, Maulana Rasool Khan, Ghulam Ghaus Hazarvi, Maulana Muhammad Abdullah Bahlavi and Khawaja Khan Muhammad are very prominent.

He has traveled many countries for da'wah and preaching. And he has also authored many books. In 1958 in Multan he was blessed to serve Syed Ata Ullah Shah Bukhari. He also had correspondence with Hussain Ahmad Madani.

Khatam un Nabiyeen Medical Complex & Heart Center 
He established the Khatam-ul-Nabyeen Medical Complex and Heart Center in Sargodha, one of the best hospitals in Pakistan. The hospital has state-of-the-art medical facilities such as angiography, angioplasty, echography, ventilator, ECG, ambulance and all external facilities. And all the treatment is half the cost.

Death 
He died of a heart attack on 26 December 2021. Maulana Fazl-ur-Rehman and others have expresses regret over his death.

References 

1930 births
2021 deaths
Pakistani Islamic religious leaders
Pakistani Sunni Muslim scholars of Islam
Jamia Ashrafia alumni
Aalmi Majlis Tahaffuz Khatm-e-Nubuwwat people
People from Sargodha District
Muslim missionaries
Pakistani philanthropists
Deobandis